Dogari may refer to several villages in Romania:

 Dogari, a village in Ciomăgești Commune, Argeș County
 Dogari, a village in Beceni Commune, Buzău County